Willie Hayes (born July 12, 1967) is the former college basketball head coach for Alabama A&M University. He signed in 2011 and the contract will go through the 2015 season. He resigned after the 2016–17 season in which the Bulldogs went 2–27.

Head coaching record

College basketball
Hayes played point guard for AAMU. He broke many school records and is considered to be one of the best to ever play for AAMU. He broke his school record for career assists (669) in 1997 and has also achieved honors such as SIAC Player of the Year in 1989, AAMU Male Athlete of the Year, and Mayor's Cup Classic MVP.

References

1967 births
Living people
Alabama A&M Bulldogs basketball coaches
Alabama A&M Bulldogs basketball players
American men's basketball coaches
American men's basketball players
Basketball coaches from Alabama
Basketball players from Alabama
College men's basketball head coaches in the United States
Sportspeople from Bessemer, Alabama